Bikie Wars: Brothers in Arms is a six-part Australian drama miniseries about bikie gang violence, screened on Network Ten on 15 May 2012. Bikie Wars is based on the book Brothers in Arms by Lindsay Simpson and Sandra Harvey. The screenplay was written by Greg Haddrick, Roger Simpson and Jo Martino. It is directed by Peter Andrikidis. Bikie Wars: Brothers in Arms cost A$6,000,000 to make.

Premise
The six-episode series dramatises the story of the Milperra massacre, when the Bandidos and the Comanchero motorcycle clubs went to war on Father's Day, Sunday 2 September 1984. The massacre had its beginnings after a group of Comancheros broke away and formed the first Bandidos Motorcycle Club chapter in Australia. This resulted in intense rivalry between the two chapters. At a public swap meet at the Viking Tavern at Milperra, New South Wales, a brief but violent battle ensued with seven people shot dead, including a 14-year-old innocent female bystander. A further 28 people were wounded with 20 requiring hospitalisation.

Each episode starts with a quote stated by Justice Adrian Roden when the clubs went before the New South Wales Supreme Court; "As patriotism can lead to jingoism and mateship can lead to cronyism, so bikie club loyalty can lead to bikie club war."

Cast

Bandidos
 Callan Mulvey as Snoddy
 Maeve Dermody as Lee (Snoddy's girlfriend)
 Damian Walshe-Howling as Chopper (Vice President of the Bandidos)
 Anthony Hayes as Caesar (Sgt-at-Arms of the Bandidos)
 Luke Hemsworth as Shadow
 Fletcher Humphrys as Bull
 Sam Parsonson as Junior
 Aaron Fa'aoso as Roo
 Richard Sutherland as Davo
 Peter Flaherty as Lard

Comanchero
 Matthew Nable as Jock Ross (President and self-proclaimed 'Supreme Commander' of the Comancheros)
 Susie Porter as Vanessa (Jock's wife)
 Richard Cawthorne as Foggy (Vice President of the Comancheros)
 Jeremy Lindsay Taylor as Leroy (Sgt-at-Arms of the Comancheros)
 Luke Ford as Snow
 Nathaniel Dean as Kraut
 Todd Lasance as Kiddo
 Manu Bennett as Sunshine
 Trent Baines as Sparra
 Pier Carthew as Dog

Episodes

Reception

Ratings 
The premiere episode won its timeslot with 1.26 million viewers based on the overnight numbers, peaking at 1.43 million viewers.

Music "Highway Mind"

Australian musician Diesel recorded and released the track "Highway Mind" for the soundtrack. It was released as a single on 16 May 2012.

Home media 
Bikie Wars: Brothers In Arms was Released on DVD & Blu-Ray In June 2012. As of March 2022 it has been out of print for sometime.

References

External links
 Official website

Australian drama television series
2010s Australian television miniseries
2012 Australian television series debuts
2012 Australian television series endings
Network 10 original programming
Television series about organized crime
Works about organised crime in Australia
Works about outlaw motorcycle clubs
Bandidos Motorcycle Club
Television shows based on non-fiction books